Hesperilla flavescens, also known as the yellow sedge-skipper or yellowish skipper, is a species of butterfly in the family Hesperiidae. It is found in the Australian states of South Australia and Victoria.

The larvae feed on Gahnia filum.

The butterfly is endangered in South Australia, and volunteers have planted gahnia at Aldinga Washpool to provide habitat for the species.

Subspecies
Hesperilla flavescens flavescens Altona skipper butterfly (near Altona and Ararat, in Victoria)
Hesperilla flavescens flavia (near Adelaide in South Australia)

References

Further reading 
 

Australian Insects (Archived)
 Australian Faunal Directory (Archived)

Trapezitinae
Fauna of South Australia
Fauna of Victoria (Australia)
Butterflies described in 1927